The Ultimate Luther Vandross is a greatest hits album by American R&B/soul singer Luther Vandross, released in 2001 (see 2001 in music). The compilation was re-released in 2006 with a different track listing, along with two previously unreleased songs. The unreleased cut "Got You Home" which appears on the 2006 edition of the compilation, earned Vandross a posthumous nomination for Best Male R&B Vocal Performance at the 49th Grammy Awards in 2007.

Track listings

2001 release
"Give Me the Reason" (Luther Vandross, Nat Adderley Jr.) – 4:45 (From the Motion Picture Soundtrack Ruthless People)
"Never Too Much" (Vandross) – 3:50 (From Never Too Much)
"If This World Were Mine" (Duet with Cheryl Lynn) (Marvin Gaye) – 4:00
"A House Is Not a Home" (Burt Bacharach, Hal David) – 7:08 (From Never Too Much)
"Don't Want to Be a Fool" (Vandross, Marcus Miller) – 4:34 (From Power of Love)
"So Amazing" (Vandross) – 3:41 (From Give Me the Reason)
"Til My Baby Comes Home" (Vandross, Miller) – 3:59 (From The Night I Fell in Love)
"There's Nothing Better Than Love" (Duet with Gregory Hines) (Vandross, John "Skip" Anderson) – 4:17 (From Give Me the Reason)
"Stop to Love" (Vandross, Miller) – 4:23 (From Give Me the Reason)
"Any Love" (Vandross, Miller) – 5:00 (From Any Love)
"Since I Lost My Baby" (Smokey Robinson, Warren Moore) – 3:52 (From Forever, for Always, for Love)
"Superstar" (Leon Russell, Bonnie Bramlett) – 5:38 (From Busy Body)
"Power of Love/Love Power" (Vandross, Miller, Teddy Vann) – 4:21 (From Power of Love)
"The Rush" (Vandross, Miller) – 3:56 (From Power of Love)
"It's Over Now" (Vandross, Miller) – 4:06 (From The Night I Fell in Love)
"Here and Now" (Terry Steele, David L. Elliott) – 5:22 (From The Best of Luther Vandross... The Best of Love)
"Love the One You're With" (Stephen Stills) – 3:45 (From Songs)

2006 re-release
"Shine" (James Harris III, Terry Lewis, Bernard Edwards, Nile Rodgers) – 4:50 (previously unreleased)
"Got You Home" (Bryan-Michael Cox, Jesse Rome, Harold Lilly) – 3:38 (previously unreleased)
"Never Too Much" (Vandross) – 3:50 (From Never Too Much)
"Take You Out" (Warryn Campbell, Harold Lilly, John Smith) – 3:26 (From Luther Vandross)
"Superstar/Until You Come Back to Me (That's What I'm Gonna Do)" (Russell, Bramlett, Stevie Wonder, Morris Broadnax, Clarence Paul) – 4:32 (From Busy Body)
"Here and Now" (Steele, Elliott) – 5:22 (From The Best of Luther Vandross... The Best of Love)
"Dance with My Father" (Vandross, Richard Marx) – 4:25 (From Dance with My Father)
"A House Is Not a Home" (Bacharach, David) – 7:08 (From Never Too Much)
"Give Me the Reason" (Vandross, Adderley) – 4:45 (From the Motion Picture Soundtrack Ruthless People)
"I'd Rather" (Shep Crawford) – 4:19 (From Luther Vandross)
"Any Love" (Vandross, Miller) – 5:00 (From Any Love)
"Power of Love/Love Power" (Vandross, Miller, Vann) – 4:19 (From Power of Love)
"Think About You" (Vandross, James Porte) – 3:28 (From Dance with My Father)
"Wait for Love" (Vandross, Adderley) – 4:16 (From The Night I Fell in Love)
"Your Secret Love" (Vandross, Reed Vertelney) – 4:01 (From Your Secret Love)
"The Closer I Get to You" (Duet with Beyoncé) (Reggie Lucas, James Mtume) – 4:25 (From Dance with My Father)
"Buy Me a Rose" (Jim Funk, Erik Hickenlooper) – 3:48 (From Dance with My Father)
"Endless Love" (Duet with Mariah Carey) (Lionel Richie) – 4:18 (From Songs)
"Shine" (Freemasons Mixshow Radio Edit) (Japan bonus track)

Special collector's edition bonus disc
"Shine" (The Freemasons Mix) – 4:51
"Power of Love/Love Power" (The Dance Radio Mix) – 6:30
"Can Heaven Wait" (David Harness Soulful Club Mix) – 7:19
"Take You Out Tonight" (Allstar Remix) – 3:45
"I'd Rather" (Mike Rizzo Global Mix) – 3:36
"'Til My Baby Comes Home" (Dance Version) – 7:38
"Stop to Love" (12" Mix) – 5:32

Charts

Weekly charts

Year-end charts

Certifications

References

2001 greatest hits albums
2006 greatest hits albums
Albums produced by Bryan-Michael Cox
Albums produced by Luther Vandross
Albums produced by Walter Afanasieff
Albums produced by Warryn Campbell
Compilation albums published posthumously
Luther Vandross compilation albums
Epic Records compilation albums
J Records compilation albums
Legacy Recordings compilation albums